was a Japanese physician, who contributed to the treatment of leprosy and to the administration of leprosy policy in Japan. Concerning the segregation policy of leprosy patients, he was against Kensuke Mitsuda and worked in Taiwan and Okinawa.

Life
He was born in Tokyo in 1918, and graduated from Tokyo Jikeikai University, now Jikei University School of Medicine in 1944. In 1944 he started to work at Nagashima Aiseien Sanatorium under Kensuke Mitsuda. In a short time he worked as army officer in China. In 1946, he returned to Nagashima Aiseien Sanatorium and studied pathology and treatment trial with promin, the wonder drug of leprosy. In 1960, he was appointed medical doctor at the Taiwan Leprosy Saving Association. In 1964, WHO leprosy specialist in West Pacific Area. In 1971, Ryukyu Government Airakuen Sanatorium director. While Okinawa was returned to Japan, he made the outpatient treatment of leprosy patients to continue only in Okinawa.  1972-1987, Okinawa Airakuen Sanatorium director. 1978, the president of the Leprosy Congress in Okinawa. Received the Sakurane Award for his immunologic studies of leprosy in Okinawa. 2001, he testified to the unconstitutionality of the leprosy prevention law. In 2007. he died in Tokyo.

1953 Lucknow Conference
Saikawa attended the 1953 Lucknow Conference, in India as the only one observer from Japan. It was a conference for leprosy management in the days when leprosy could be cured. Kensuke Mitsuda asked Saikawa for his questions since many noted scholars attended it, including R.G.Cochrane and Dharmendra, with Mitsuda's atlas of pathology of atlas for distribution. They were of the opinion that promin could cure leprosy; if not, new chemicals may be found. Kensuke Mitsuda thought that Japan was rich in the nodular type and they could not endure leprosy stigma if patients were discharged into the society.

Books written and edited
Papers on leprosy written in Okinawa(1979), Naha
Wounds in leprosy(1982), Naha
The gate is open(1989), Misuzu Shobo, Tokyo
Leprosy in the Bible(1994), Shikyo Shuppansha, Tokyo
Leprosy medicine is my road(1996), Iwanami Shoten, Tokyo
Leprosy in Chinese classics(1998), Naha 
The history of leprosy administration (1999), Naha

Papers
Immunological studies of leprosy in Okinawa, part 1, New patients, Repura, 43, 53-62,1974.
part 2, Geographical distribution, Repura 44,150-162,1975.
part 3, Remote islands, Repura 46,1-7, 1977.
part 4, Leprosy in cities, Repura 46, 8-13, 1977.
There were many other papers by Saikawa.

Criticisms
Yutaka Fujino criticized Saikawa for his warm evaluation of Kensuke Mitsuda who was a stubborn leprosy patient segregationalist. Saikawa also criticized Mitsuda's testimony before the Welfare Committee of the House of Councillors.

References
I selected the treatment of leprosy(1996.4) Bull Okinawa Pref Naha Hospital, vol. 6, 54-59.ハンセン病の医療を歩んで(1996.4) 犀川一夫 沖縄県立那覇病院雑誌 第6号 54-59. 
Inochi No Kindaishi(Modern history of life, 2001), Yutaka Fujino, Kamogawa Shuppan, Tokyo. ^ 「「いのち」の近代史」（2001年、かもがわ出版） p625

Footnotes

1918 births
2007 deaths
Japanese leprologists